Michaell Anthony Chirinos Cortez (born 17 June 1995) is a Honduran professional footballer who plays as a winger for Greek Super League club Volos and the Honduras national team.

Club career
On 14 June 2018, Chirinos signed with Lobos BUAP of Liga MX on a one-year loan from C.D. Olimpia. He scored his first goal on 4 February 2019 in a 1–1 draw against C.F. Pachuca.

On 3 August 2019, Chirinos signed with Major League Soccer team Vancouver Whitecaps FC for the remainder of the season. He scored his first goal for the club on September 30, the winner in a 4–3 away victory against the LA Galaxy.

Honours

Olimpia
CONCACAF League: 2017, 2022

Individual
CONCACAF League Team of the Tournament: 2017
CONCACAF League Golden Ball: 2017, 2022

References

External links

 

1995 births
Living people
Honduran footballers
Honduras international footballers
Association football midfielders
C.D. Olimpia players
Lobos BUAP footballers
Vancouver Whitecaps FC players
Liga Nacional de Fútbol Profesional de Honduras players
Liga MX players
Major League Soccer players
Sportspeople from Tegucigalpa
Honduran expatriate footballers
Expatriate footballers in Mexico
Expatriate soccer players in Canada
Honduran expatriate sportspeople in Mexico
Honduran expatriate sportspeople in Canada
2015 CONCACAF U-20 Championship players
2017 CONCACAF Gold Cup players
2019 CONCACAF Gold Cup players
2021 CONCACAF Gold Cup players